The 2017 Vuelta a Asturias was the 60th edition of the Vuelta a Asturias cycling stage race, that took place over three stages from 29 April to 1 May 2017. It was held as part of the 2017 UCI Europe Tour. The defending champion was Hugh Carthy, but Carthy did not defend his title as he had moved to the  squad that was not invited to the race.

The race was won by Spanish rider Raúl Alarcón, riding for the Portuguese  team. Over the stages, Alarcón won one and finished the other two in second place – more than enough for the points classification win – as he triumphed in the race overall by 32 seconds.

In the race's other classifications, Colombians Sergio Higuita and Hernán Aguirre from  won the mountains and young rider classifications respectively,  rider Fernando Grijalba won the sprints classification, while  won the teams classification, after placing Alarcón, Ricardo Mestre (seventh) and Joaquim Silva (ninth) in the top ten overall.

In March 2021 Raúl Alarcón due to doping had all his results obtained between July 28, 2015 and October 21, 2019, cancelled, including 2017 Vuelta a Asturias.

Route
The race includes three road stages on consecutive days; the exact stage details were released on 20 April 2017.

Teams
A total of 20 teams raced in the 2017 Vuelta a Asturias.

Stages

Stage 1
29 April 2017 — Oviedo to Pola de Lena,

Stage 2
30 April 2017 — Ribera de Arriba to Alto del Acebo,

Stage 3
1 May 2017 — Cangas del Narcea to Oviedo,

Classification leadership table
In the 2017 Vuelta a Asturias, four jerseys were awarded. The general classification was calculated by adding each cyclist's finishing times on each stage. Time bonuses were awarded to the first three finishers on all stages: the stage winner won a ten-second bonus, with six and four seconds for the second and third riders respectively. Bonus seconds were also awarded to the first three riders at intermediate sprints – three seconds for the winner of the sprint, two seconds for the rider in second and one second for the rider in third. The leader of the general classification received a blue jersey. This classification was considered the most important of the 2017 Vuelta a Asturias, and the winner of the classification was considered the winner of the race.

Additionally, there was a points classification, which awarded a green jersey. In the points classification, cyclists received points for finishing in the top 15 in a stage. For winning a stage, a rider earned 25 points, with 20 for second, 16 for third, 14 for fourth, 12 for fifth, 10 for sixth with a point fewer per place down to a single point for 15th place. There was also a sprints classification for the points awarded at intermediate sprints on each stage – awarded on a 3–2–1 scale – where the leadership of which was marked by a black-and-white jersey.

The fourth jersey represented the mountains classification, marked by a white jersey. Points for this classification were won by the first riders to the top of each categorised climb, with more points available for the higher-categorised climbs. There was also a classification for teams, in which the times of the best three cyclists per team on each stage were added together; the leading team at the end of the race was the team with the lowest total time.

References

Sources

External links

2017
2017 UCI Europe Tour
2017 in Spanish road cycling